The 2023 International Challenge Cup was held from February 23 to 26, 2023 in Tilburg, The Netherlands. Skaters competed in the disciplines of men's singles and women's singles on the senior, junior, advanced novice, and basic novice levels, and pair skating and ice dance at the senior and junior levels. This event served as a chance for skaters to earn the minimum Technical Element Scores (TES) preceding the 2023 World Championships.

Entries

Senior entries

Junior entries

Advanced novice entries

Basic novice entries

Senior results

Men's singles 

  Andrew Torgashev earned his TES minimums required for the 2023 World Championships through this competition.

Women's singles 

  Jade Hovine earned her TES minimum (SP) required for the 2023 World Championships through this competition.

Pairs 

  Isabella Gamez / Alexander Korovin earned their TES minimum (SP) required for the 2023 World Championships through this competition.

Ice dance 

  Sofía Val / Asaf Kazimov and  Chelsea Verhaegh / Sherim van Geffen earned their TES minimums required for the 2023 World Championships through this competition.

Junior results

Men's singles

Women's singles

Pairs

Ice dance

Advanced novice results

Boys' singles

Girls' singles

Basic novice results

Boys' singles

Girls' singles

References 

2023 in figure skating